is the name of two adjacent railway stations located in Kita-ku, Sakai, Osaka Prefecture, Japan.  The above ground station is an interchange station operated jointly by the private  Nankai Electric Railway and the Semboku Rapid Railway, and the underground station is operated by the Osaka Metro. The name of the station is difficult to read in kanji. The subway station shows the name in hiragana (なかもず) for information, but uses kanji for the official station name. The Semboku Rapid Railway Line uses both kanji and hiragana (中もず) on the destination signs at the stations and on the destination displays on the trains.

Lines

Layout

Nankai Railway Koya Line, Semboku Rapid Railway

The above-ground Nakamozu Station has two island platforms serving four tracks, with an elevated station building. The outer tracks are used for the Kōya Line and the inner ones are for Semboku. A reversing track for Semboku is located in the west of the platforms and between 2 tracks for the Kōya Line.

Platforms

Osaka Metro Midosuji Line

The Osaka Municipal Subway station has an underground island platform serving two tracks. It is the southernmost station on the Osaka subway system.

Platform

Adjacent stations

History
Nakamozu Station opened on October 10, 1912. The Semboku Rapid Railway Line opened on April 1, 1971 and the Osaka Municipal Subway Midosuji Line on April 18, 1987.

The facilities of the Midosuji Line were inherited by Osaka Metro after the privatization of the Osaka Municipal Transportation Bureau on 1 April 2018.

Passenger statistics
In fiscal 2019, the Nankai portion of the station was used by an average of 24,442 passengers daily, the Senboku portion of the station by 39,021 passengers daily and the Osaka Metro by 76,151 passengers daily..

Surrounding area
 Sakai Chamber of Commerce
 Osaka Prefecture University Nakamozu Campus

See also
 List of railway stations in Japan

References

External links

 Nakamozu Station from Nankai Electric Railway website 
 Nakamozu Station from Osaka Municipal Transportation Bureau website 

Railway stations in Japan opened in 1987
Railway stations in Japan opened in 1912
Railway stations in Osaka Prefecture
Osaka Metro stations
Sakai, Osaka